was a Japanese professional wrestler, better known by his ring name .  During his wrestling career, Ueda primarily stood out for wrestling with bleached blonde hair, a practice which was rare in his day but later became more common.  His ring name was inspired by samurai warrior and Shinsengumi member Umanosuke Ueda.

Professional wrestling career 
After debuting in the old Japan Pro Wrestling Alliance in 1961, he started the circuit in Los Angeles in 1966. In 1974, he joined Japan's International Pro Wrestling where he held the IWA World Heavyweight Championship from June 11, 1976, till July 28, 1976. Ueda was considered one of the first "traitor heels" in Japan, as he broke societal mores by dyeing his hair and using a brawling style, and teaming with a hated gaikokujin heel, Tiger Jeet Singh. The two men were the first team to win tag team titles in both New Japan Pro-Wrestling (the NWA North American Tag Team Championship) and All Japan Pro Wrestling (the NWA International Tag Team Championship).

Mr. Gannosuke, Tatsutoshi Goto and Toru Yano later based their "dye job brawler" ring personas on Ueda's style. More recently, Takaaki Watanabe has based his "Evil" persona on Ueda.

He later went on to appear as a henchman in the Japanese game show Takeshi's Castle up until the end of the show in the late '80s and also appeared in the movie Burst City.

In 1996, he was in a car accident, which left him paralyzed and eventually forced him to retire two years later.

Ueda died on December 21, 2011, from respiratory failure; he was 71 years old.

Championships and accomplishments 
All Japan Pro Wrestling
NWA International Tag Team Championship (2 times) - with Kintaro Ohki (1) and Tiger Jeet Singh (1)
International Wrestling Enterprise
IWA World Heavyweight Championship (1 time)
Mid-South Sports
NWA Georgia Tag Team Championship (1 time) - with Chati Yokouchi
New Japan Pro-Wrestling
Asia Tag Team Championship (1 time) - with Tiger Jeet Singh
NWA North American Tag Team Championship (Los Angeles/Japan version) (1 time) - with Tiger Jeet Singh
NWA Big Time Wrestling
NWA World Tag Team Championship (1 time) - with Chati Yokouchi
NWA Mid-America
NWA World Tag Team Championship (Mid-America version) (1 time) - with Tojo Yamamoto
NWA Tri-State
NWA World Junior Heavyweight Championship (1 time)
Tokyo Sports
Popularity Award (1978)
Western States Sports
NWA Western States Tag Team Championship (1 time) - with Chati Yokouchi
 NWA World Tag Team Championship (Amarillo version) (1 time) - with Chati Yokouchi
World Wrestling Organization
WWO Heavyweight Championship (1 time)

References

External links
 Umanosuke Ueda at PuroresuCentral.com
 
 

Japanese male professional wrestlers
People from Yatomi
Sportspeople from Aichi Prefecture
Deaths from respiratory failure
2011 deaths
1940 births
Professional wrestling promoters
20th-century professional wrestlers
NWA North American Tag Team Champions (Los Angeles/Japan version)
NWA International Tag Team Champions
NWA Georgia Tag Team Champions